Seven ships of the Royal Navy have borne the name HMS Sibyl or HMS Sybille, named for the Greek mythological figures, the Sibyls (Greek: Σίβυλλα):

  was a 28-gun sixth rate launched in 1779. She was renamed HMS Garland in 1795 and was wrecked in 1798.
She was captured in 1794, reduced to harbour service in 1831 and was sold in 1833.
  was a 36-gun fifth rate launched in 1847 and broken up in 1866.
  was an  launched in 1890 and wrecked in 1901.
  was an M-class destroyer launched in 1913 and sold in 1926.
  was an S-class submarine launched in 1942 and broken up in 1948.
She was renamed  before her launch in 1944.

See also 
 French ship Sibylle

References
 

Royal Navy ship names